Serravalle is a castello in northern San Marino. With a population of 10,878 inhabitants (of whom 2,000 are of foreign origin) and an area of 10.53 km2, it is not only the most densely populated municipality in San Marino, but it also contains its largest settlement (Dogana). Serravalle is located on the edge of the Apennine Mountains.

Geography 
The town borders on Sammarinese municipalities of Domagnano and Borgo Maggiore and the Italian municipalities Verucchio, Rimini and Coriano. Serravalle counts a surrounding quarter named Galazzano, where the weather station and an industrial area are located. Serravalle has San Marino's northernmost and lowest elevated points.

History 
First mentioned in a 962 document, in medieval times this town was called Castrum Olnani (later Olnano), the village of the elm trees. Serravalle attached to San Marino in 1463, during the last territorial expansion of the Republic.

Parishes 
Serravalle has 8 parishes (curazie):
 Cà Ragni
 Cinque Vie
 Dogana
 Falciano
 Lesignano
 Ponte Mellini
 Rovereta
 Valgiurata

Points of interest 
 Chiesa di Sant Andrea (Saint Andrea's Church), built in 1824 by  Luigi Fonti
 Stadio Olimpico, not a stadium built to house the Olympics, but rather to house local San Marino football games
 Stadio di Baseball di Serravalle, home ballpark for the T & A San Marino Baseball Club, which participates in the Italian Baseball League

References

External links 

 
Municipalities of San Marino